Elections to the Baseball Hall of Fame for 1985 followed the system in place since 1978. 
The Baseball Writers' Association of America (BBWAA) voted by mail to select from recent major league players and 
elected two, Lou Brock and Hoyt Wilhelm. The Veterans Committee met in closed sessions to consider older major league players as well as managers, umpires, executives, and figures from the Negro leagues. It also selected two players, Enos Slaughter and Arky Vaughan. A formal induction ceremony was held in Cooperstown, New York, on July 28, 1985, with broadcaster Brent Musburger handling introductions and Commissioner of Baseball Peter Ueberroth in attendance.

BBWAA election 
The BBWAA was authorized to elect players active in 1965 or later, but not after 1979; the ballot included candidates from the 1984 ballot who received at least 5% of the vote but were not elected, along with selected players, chosen by a screening committee, whose last appearance was in 1979. All 10-year members of the BBWAA were eligible to vote.

Eleven players, who had previously been dropped from the ballot, were re-listed, following review and approval from a committee of six writers. Added were: Richie Allen, Ken Boyer, Clay Carroll, Ron Fairly, Curt Flood, Harvey Haddix, Denny McLain, Dave McNally, Vada Pinson, Ron Santo, and Wilbur Wood. Ultimately, none of the 11 were elected by the BBWAA, with only Santo gaining entry to the Hall, via selection by the Golden Era Committee in 2012 balloting.

Voters were instructed to cast votes for up to 10 candidates; any candidate receiving votes on at least 75% of the ballots would be honored with induction to the Hall. The ballot consisted of 41 players; a total of 395 ballots were cast, with 297 votes required for election. A total of 2,918 individual votes were cast, an average of 7.39 per ballot. Those candidates receiving less than 5% of the vote will not appear on future BBWAA ballots, but may eventually be considered by the Veterans Committee.

Candidates who were eligible for the first time are indicated here with a dagger (†). The two candidates who received at least 75% of the vote and were elected are indicated in bold italics; candidates who have since been elected in subsequent elections are indicated in italics. The 18 candidates who received less than 5% of the vote, thus becoming ineligible for future BBWAA consideration, are indicated with an asterisk (*).

Nellie Fox was on the ballot for the 15th and final time.

Thurman Munson, who died in a plane crash in 1979, would have been eligible for the first time, but the five-year waiting period was waived.

The newly eligible players included 16 All-Stars, two of whom were not included on the ballot, representing a total of 44 All-Star selections. Among the new candidates were 8-time All-Star Catfish Hunter,.and 6-time All-Stars Lou Brock and Don Kessinger. The field included two Cy Young Award-winners (Catfish Hunter and Jim Lonborg), as well as George Scott, whose eight Gold Gloves at first base were a record at the time.

Players eligible for the first time who were not on the ballot were: Darrel Chaney, Gene Clines, Joe Coleman, Willie Davis, Frank Duffy, Ray Fosse, Ellie Hendricks, Steve Mingori, Bob Montgomery, Tom Murphy, Bob Robertson, Wayne Twitchell, and Bobby Valentine.

J. G. Taylor Spink Award 
Joe McGuff (1926–2006) received the J. G. Taylor Spink Award honoring a baseball writer. The award was voted at the December 1984 meeting of the BBWAA, and included in the summer 1985 ceremonies.

References

External links 
1985 Election at www.baseballhalloffame.org

Baseball Hall of Fame balloting
Hall of Fame balloting